Khidirpur metro station is a planned underground metro station in Kidderpore, Kolkata, India. The station is under construction. It is a station of the Kolkata Metro Line 3. This station will be built in the second phase of the construction of the Kolkata Metro Line 3. There will be two platforms at this station.

References

Kolkata Metro stations
Railway stations opened in 2013
Railway stations in Kolkata